Mir Ghazanfar Ali Khan (Urdu: میر غضنفر علی خان, born 31 December 1945) is a Pakistani politician who served as the 6th Governor of Gilgit-Baltistan.

He was appointed as a governor of Gilgit-Baltistan after governor Barjees Tahir. On 14 September 2018, he resigned from his post.

Family Background 
Mir Ghazanfar belongs to the ruling family of Hunza. He is the son of the Last Mir of Hunza, Muhammad Jamal Khan. Mir Mohammad Jamal Khan was the son of Mir Ghazan II. Mohammad Jamal Khan was named Mir on 25 September 1974. When he died in 1976, his son Ghazanfar Ali Khan II became the non-sovereign head of the state in 1976. The State of Hunza was dissolved by Zulfikar Ali Bhutto, Prime Minister of Pakistan on 25 Sep 1974. Thus, the title of Mir is only titular. 

Ghazanfar has 3 sons: Salim Khan, Shehryar Khan and Salman Khan.

See also 
 List of Governors of Pakistan

References 

1945 births
Living people
Pakistani Muslims
Governors of Gilgit-Baltistan
People from Gilgit-Baltistan
Pakistan Muslim League (N) politicians
People from Hunza-Nagar District
Monarchs who abdicated
People from Hunza
Burusho people
Government Gordon College alumni